The  was established in 1989 as part of the cultural building boom in Yamagata celebrating the 100-year anniversary of the founding of the city. Located about 20 minutes by train (Senzan Line between Yamagata and Sendai) from Yamagata Station, it sits on the south side of the steep river valley facing Yamadera to the north, the historic temple founded in 860 which is one of the area's  most beloved sacred sites and top sightseeing destinations.

The Museum focuses on the life of Matsuo Bashō (1644–1694) who perfected the art of haiku, the concise 5-7-5 syllable verse form now appreciated and written around the world. Many treasures from Basho's own hand and writing brush are regularly displayed, along with works of literati and artists from his time, and of those who followed later. Special exhibitions on related themes are also regularly mounted in the gallery.

The spacious grounds and gardens are beautiful all year round, and the facility includes many traditional Japanese style meeting rooms and tea rooms which are regularly used for citizens' tea ceremonies and other cultural programs, including seminars on literature and haiku taikai poetry writing contests　(俳句大会）, in both Japanese and English. The beautiful buildings in traditional sukiya-zukuri (数寄屋造り）tea ceremony room style were designed by the well-known architect Masao Nakamura.  
Information is also available in English on the exhibitions and on Basho's life and his major work Oku no Hosomichi "The Narrow Road to the Deep North," his travel journal of haiku and paintings based on his trip to the area.

Yamadera Basho Memorial Museum
4223 Aza Nan-in, Oaza Yamadera, Yamagata-shi
Japan 999-3301
telephone : 023-695-2221 The Museum is closed some Mondays, especially in the depth of winter.

http://yamadera-basho.jp/?p=top

References

Museums in Yamagata Prefecture
Museums established in 1989
Literary museums in Japan
Basho, Yamadera
Haiku
1989 establishments in Japan
Yamagata, Yamagata